The Roslavl constituency (No.176) is a Russian legislative constituency in Smolensk Oblast. The constituency covers parts of Smolensk and southern Smolensk Oblast, which until 2007 was divided between Smolensk and Vyazma constituencies.

Members elected

Election results

2016

|-
! colspan=2 style="background-color:#E9E9E9;text-align:left;vertical-align:top;" |Candidate
! style="background-color:#E9E9E9;text-align:left;vertical-align:top;" |Party
! style="background-color:#E9E9E9;text-align:right;" |Votes
! style="background-color:#E9E9E9;text-align:right;" |%
|-
|style="background-color: " |
|align=left|Olga Okuneva
|align=left|United Russia
|
|45.94%
|-
|style="background-color:"|
|align=left|Andrey Mitrofanenkov
|align=left|Communist Party
|
|17.69%
|-
|style="background-color:"|
|align=left|Sergey Leonov
|align=left|Liberal Democratic Party
|
|14.39%
|-
|style="background-color:"|
|align=left|Sergey Lebedev
|align=left|A Just Russia
|
|8.38%
|-
|style="background:"| 
|align=left|Sergey Alkhimov
|align=left|Patriots of Russia
|
|2.17%
|-
|style="background:"| 
|align=left|Sergey Revenko
|align=left|Yabloko
|
|2.12%
|-
|style="background:"| 
|align=left|Aleksey Protasov
|align=left|Communists of Russia
|
|2.02%
|-
|style="background-color:"|
|align=left|Dmitry Savhcnekov
|align=left|Rodina
|
|1.71%
|-
|style="background: "| 
|align=left|Pavel Yukhimenko
|align=left|Party of Growth
|
|1.11%
|-
|style="background-color:"|
|align=left|Artyom Kraynov
|align=left|The Greens
|
|1.02%
|-
| colspan="5" style="background-color:#E9E9E9;"|
|- style="font-weight:bold"
| colspan="3" style="text-align:left;" | Total
| 
| 100%
|-
| colspan="5" style="background-color:#E9E9E9;"|
|- style="font-weight:bold"
| colspan="4" |Source:
|
|}

2021

|-
! colspan=2 style="background-color:#E9E9E9;text-align:left;vertical-align:top;" |Candidate
! style="background-color:#E9E9E9;text-align:left;vertical-align:top;" |Party
! style="background-color:#E9E9E9;text-align:right;" |Votes
! style="background-color:#E9E9E9;text-align:right;" |%
|-
|style="background-color:"|
|align=left|Sergey Leonov
|align=left|Liberal Democratic Party
|
|34.56%
|-
|style="background-color:"|
|align=left|Andrey Shaposhnikov
|align=left|Communist Party
|
|21.90%
|-
|style="background-color:"|
|align=left|Anna Andreyenkova
|align=left|United Russia
|
|18.97%
|-
|style="background-color:"|
|align=left|Olga Kalistratova
|align=left|A Just Russia — For Truth
|
|8.90%
|-
|style="background-color: "|
|align=left|Mikhail Tsyganov
|align=left|Party of Pensioners
|
|5.87%
|-
|style="background-color: "|
|align=left|Svetlana Gorina
|align=left|Party of Growth
|
|2.96%
|-
|style="background: "| 
|align=left|Sergey Revenko
|align=left|Yabloko
|
|1.82%
|-
| colspan="5" style="background-color:#E9E9E9;"|
|- style="font-weight:bold"
| colspan="3" style="text-align:left;" | Total
| 
| 100%
|-
| colspan="5" style="background-color:#E9E9E9;"|
|- style="font-weight:bold"
| colspan="4" |Source:
|
|}

References

Russian legislative constituencies
Politics of Smolensk Oblast